Arthur James Jewell (1898–1952), also known as A. J. Jewell, was an English association football manager and referee who during his career coached Norwich City in 1939.

Jewell was born in West Hampstead, London in 1898. During the First World War he served in the Royal Naval Air Service and became in 1918 one of the first pilots of the Royal Air Force.

He refereed in the 1938 FA Cup Final as well seventeen international matches, including a game between Austria and Egypt in the football tournament at the 1936 Summer Olympics in Berlin.

During the Second World War, he served as a RAF Physical Fitness Officer.

He became a television commentator for the BBC in 1947 and commentated during the 1948 Summer Olympics as well as five FA Cup Finals before his sudden death in 1952.

References

External links

Norwich City F.C. managers
English football managers
English football referees
FA Cup Final referees
Olympic football referees
1898 births
1952 deaths
Royal Flying Corps officers
Royal Naval Air Service personnel of World War I
Royal Air Force officers
People from Hampstead
Royal Navy officers of World War I
British Army personnel of World War I
Royal Air Force personnel of World War I